The 1975 British Hard Court Championships, also known by its sponsored name Coca-Cola British Hard Court Championships, was a combined men's and women's tennis tournament played on outdoor clay courts at The West Hants Club in Bournemouth, England. The event was part of the Grand Prix circuit and categorized as B class. It was the 46th edition of the tournament and was held from 12 May through 18 May 1975. Manuel Orantes and Janet Newberry won the singles titles.

Finals

Men's singles
 Manuel Orantes defeated  Patrick Proisy 6–3, 4–6, 6–2, 7–5

Women's singles
 Janet Newberry defeated  Terry Holladay 7–9, 7–5, 6–3

Men's doubles
 Juan Gisbert /  Manuel Orantes defeated  Syd Ball /  Dick Crealy  8–6, 6–3

Women's doubles
 Lesley Charles /  Sue Mappin defeated  Linky Boshoff /  Greer Stevens 6–3, 6–3

References

External links
 ITF Tournament edition details

British Hard Court Championships
British Hard Court Championships
Clay court tennis tournaments
1975 in English tennis